Freeway 5 may refer to:

 Freeway 5 (Greece)
 Freeway 5 (Iran)
 Freeway 5 (Taiwan)